Larrie D. Ferreiro  is a naval architect and historian.

Early life 
He was born and raised on Long Island, New York, United States. His great-grandfather was an immigrant from Galicia, Spain.

Career 
He completed his Ph.D at Imperial College London in 2004. He did his M.Sc. and BSE in Naval Architecture.

He is currently director of research at the Defense Acquisition University in Fort Belvoir, Virginia, and Adjunct Professor of History at George Mason University.  He was previously a naval architect and systems engineer at the Office of Naval Research, Naval Sea Systems Command and US Coast Guard, and an exchange engineer with the French Navy.

He was a Pulitzer Prize finalist in History for his book Brothers at Arms.

Bibliography 
Some of his books are:

 Measure of the Earth: The Enlightenment Expedition That Reshaped Our World. New York, NY : Basic Books, 2011,  
 Brothers at Arms: American Independence and the Men of France and Spain Who Saved It.  Alfred A. Knopf, 2016.  
 Ships and Science: The Birth of Naval Architecture in the Scientific Revolution, 1600-1800. MIT Press 2006.  
 Bridging the Seas: The Rise of Naval Architecture in the Industrial Age, 1800-2000. MIT Press, 2020. 
 Churchill's American Arsenal: The Partnership Behind the Innovations that Won World War Two. Oxford University Press, 2022.

References

External links
 

Year of birth missing (living people)
Living people
American people of Spanish descent
American people of Galician descent
21st-century American historians
American male non-fiction writers
Alumni of Imperial College London
George Mason University faculty
21st-century American male writers